The following were mayors of Sandwich, Kent, England:

1214: Augar or Algar
Before 1227: Helyas de Kingston and Peter the Baker
1348–1349: William Ive
1376–78: William Ive
1457 John Drury, who was killed in a French attack on the town, and in whose memory the mayor wears a black robe
1555–6, 1559–60: John Manwood
1665–66: James Thurbarne

References

 Sandwich
Sandwich, Kent
Sandwich